Laura Hoffmann (born 12 August 1991) is a German footballer who plays as a defender for SpVg Berghoven.

Career

Statistics

References

External links
 

1991 births
Living people
People from Meschede
Sportspeople from Arnsberg (region)
German women's footballers
Women's association football defenders
Frauen-Bundesliga players
2. Frauen-Bundesliga players
SG Wattenscheid 09 (women) players
SGS Essen players
VfL Bochum (women) players
Footballers from North Rhine-Westphalia